The Nenana Depot, located at 900 A Street in Nenana, Alaska, is an Alaska Railroad depot built in 1922. The station served an extension of the railroad which was laid in 1916. An addition was placed on the station in 1937 to house the station agent. The station has served both as an important part of the railroad's northern operations and as a terminal for its riverboat service on the Yukon River. It was listed on the National Register of Historic Places in 1977.

In 1987 the Alaska State Railroad Museum was established in the depot. The Museum discontinued in 2017. 

On November 11, 2020, the Friends of the Tanana Valley Railroad (FTVRR) signed with the City of Nenana to become the new caretakers of the depot. The FTVRR will reopen the depot as a museum after repairs and renovations. The museum will be open daily, May - September.

See also
National Register of Historic Places listings in Yukon–Koyukuk Census Area, Alaska

References

Alaska Railroad stations
Railway stations on the National Register of Historic Places in Alaska
Buildings and structures on the National Register of Historic Places in Yukon–Koyukuk Census Area, Alaska
Railway stations in the United States opened in 1922
1922 establishments in Alaska